Mukhosh is a 2022 Bangladeshi mystery thriller film directed by Efthakhar Suvo. With the grant from Government of Bangladesh, Efthakhar Suvo produced the film under the banner of Bachelor Dot Com Production, and Cop Creation serverd as the distributor. It is based on his unpublished novel Page Number 44. The film stars Mosharraf Karim, Pori Moni, Ziaul Roshan, Iresh Zaker, Pran Roy, Faruque Ahmed, Rashed Mamun Apu,, Azad Abul Kalam, Tarek Sapan, Elina Shammi and Alongkar Chowdhury. It was released on 4 March 2022.

Cast
 Mosharraf Karim as Ibrahim Khaledi
 Pori Moni
 Ziaul Roshan as Sayan
 Iresh Zaker
 Azad Abul Kalam
 Faruque Ahmed
 Pran Roy
 Rashed Mamun Apu
 Tarik Shopon
 Elina Shammi
 Alongkar Chowdhury

Production
Mosharraf Karim joined the cast in November 2020. Principal photography started in January 2021. Mukhosh has been extensively shot in Ekushey Book Fair, Sylhet, Tangail, BFDC and Padma Char areas.

Soundtrack

Release
The trailer of the film dropped on YouTube on 18 February 2022. Mukhosh was released on 4 March 2022 in Bangladesh. Previously, it was scheduled to release on 21 January 2022, but due to sudden surge of the  omicron variant in Bangladesh, it was delayed to the new date.

References

External links
 

2022 films
Bengali-language Bangladeshi films
2020s Bengali-language films
Bangladeshi mystery films
Government of Bangladesh grants films